Hell's Hole is a 1923 American silent Western film directed by Emmett J. Flynn and written by Bernard McConville. The film stars Buck Jones, Maurice Bennett Flynn, Ruth Clifford, Eugene Pallette, George Siegmann, and Kathleen Key. The film was released on September 23, 1923, by Fox Film Corporation.

Cast

Preservation
With no prints of Hell's Hole located in any film archives, it is a lost film.

References

External links

 
 
 Lobby card at silentfilmstillarchive.com

1923 films
1923 Western (genre) films
Fox Film films
Films directed by Emmett J. Flynn
American black-and-white films
Silent American Western (genre) films
1920s English-language films
1920s American films